Allègre or Allegre may refer to:

Places

 Allègre, commune in the Haute-Loire department in south-central France
 Allegre, Kentucky, unincorporated community in Todd County, Kentucky, United States
 Allègre-les-Fumades, commune in the Gard department in southern France
 Porto Alegre, capital of the Brazilian state of Rio Grande do Sul.

People

 Claude Allègre (born 1937), French politician and scientist
 Luis Alegre (c,1510-1570s), Flemish soldier in the service of the Spanish Crown.
 Raul Allegre (born 1959), American football player in the National Football League
 Vincent Allègre (1835–1899), a French lawyer and politician

See also
 Allegri, an Italian surname